The Baháʼí Faith is a world religion that was founded in the 19th century Middle East. Its founders and the majority of its early followers were of Iranian heritage, and it is widely regarded as the second-largest religion in Iran after Islam. Though most Baháʼís in Iran are of a Muslim background, the 19th century conversions of sizeable numbers of individuals from Judaism and Zoroastrianism in the country are also well documented.

The early history of the Baháʼí Faith in Iran covers the lives of these founders, their families, and their earliest prominent followers known by honorific designations such as the Letters of the Living and the Apostles of Baháʼu'lláh.

Since its inception the Baháʼí Faith has promoted democratically elected councils; the promotion of modern education as a priority within families (with emphasis on female education) and specific encouragement of women's equality with men. Iranian Baháʼís have created schools, agricultural cooperatives, and medical clinics across the country for themselves and others. Iran is also where the greatest persecution of Baháʼís has taken place—including the denial of education, arbitrary arrest, and killing. Iran's long history of state-sponsored persecution against Bábís and Baháʼís is well documented. The website "Archives of Baháʼí Persecution in Iran" has compiled thousands of documents, reports, testimonials, photos, and videos revealing proof of efforts to suppress and eliminate Baháʼís, particularly since the Iranian revolution of 1979.

Origins and early years

Central Figures

The Báb 

Baháʼís trace the origin of their faith to 1844, when Siyyid 'Alí-Muhammad of Shiraz taught that he was a divine messenger with a mission to prepare for the imminent appearance of the "Promised One" of all religions. 'Alí-Muhammad was a direct descendant of Muhammad, born on 20 October 1819, and referred to himself as the "Báb", a religious title meaning "the Gate", indicating his position as a spiritual “gate to divine knowledge”, and to a still greater God-sent educator whose imminent appearance he was preparing the way for. The bedrock of his theology was that a new era in human history had dawned, during which the oneness of all religions and their progressive nature as successive stages of guidance from the same Creator would become clear.

As the Báb's teachings spread thousands soon became followers. Islamic clergy began to stir up hostility towards the Báb and violence against his adherents (called Bábís). Insisting divine revelation had ended with Muhammad, Muslim clerics denounced the Báb's ideas as heretical, and also portrayed them as destabilizing for the best interests of the Shah of Persia. By manipulating support from fearful authorities, such clergy initiated a frenzy of persecution fueled by fanatical hatred rooted in religious prejudice. As killings began to spread around the country they ultimately resulted in wanton massacres of an estimated 20,000 Bábís. In a desperate bid to eradicate his faith, Persia's prime minister ordered the public execution of the Báb; it took place in Tabriz on 9 July 1850 before an estimated crowd of 10,000, in circumstances reported as miraculous by both Iranian eyewitnesses and foreign diplomats. Oppression against the faith in Iran has continued unabated ever since, up through the present day.

The Báb proclaimed he was the first of two "twin" manifestations of God sent by the Creator to prepare humanity for, and to usher in, its age of maturity when the human race as a whole will finally realize global unity. Baháʼís hold that the Báb's teachings lay the groundwork "for the eventual establishment of a society characterized by the unity of nations, fellowship of religions, equal rights of all people, and a compassionate, consultative, tolerant, democratic, moral world order". Woven throughout the Báb's teachings are references to "Him whom God shall make manifest", the great Promised One for whom he was preparing the way. In numerous prophesies the Báb stated that next divine educator would appear soon after the Báb's own passing. In one of his major works, the Báb stated: "Well is it with him who fixeth his gaze upon the Order of Baháʼu'lláh, and rendereth thanks unto his Lord."

Baháʼu'lláh 

Husayn ʻAlí Núrí was one of the earliest and most active followers of the Báb. He first became known by the title "Baháʼu'lláh" (meaning "the Glory of God") among Bábís. Born on 12 November 1817 in Tehran, Baháʼu'lláh's father was a wealthy government minister who traced his ancestry to monarchs of the great Sasanian Empire.  As the initial pogrom against Bábís spread across Iran, Baháʼu'lláh was spared due to his acknowledged public reputation for devoted service to the poor and the prestige of his family. However that ended when two disturbed youths, obsessed with the execution of the Báb which they blamed on the reigning monarch, attempted to assassinate Naser al-Din Shah on 15 August 1852. Though investigations showed the pair acted alone, a "reign of terror" was unleashed, killing at least 10,000 Bábís that same year as government ministers vied with one another to collectively punish known or suspected Bábís. Because of his prominence in support of the Bábí cause, Baháʼu'lláh was arrested and incarcerated in the notorious Síyáh-Chál of Tehran, where he was bound in heavy chains that left life-long scars. When Baháʼu'lláh did not quickly perish as had been expected, his food was poisoned—which impaired his health for years. Baháʼu'lláh was kept in that dungeon for four months, as the mother of the Shah and authorities seeking to curry favor with the king sought ways to justify executing him. When it was proven beyond any doubt that Baháʼu'lláh was absolutely innocent of any wrongdoing, the Shah finally agreed to free him but decreed Baháʼu'lláh would be forever banished from Iran. Dispossessed of his extensive properties and wealth, in the exceptionally severe winter of January 1853 Baháʼu'lláh with family members undertook a three-month journey to Baghdad, thus beginning what became exile for the rest of his life in territories of the Ottoman Empire.

From Baghdad, Baháʼu'lláh dispatched communications and teachers to inspire and revive the persecuted followers of the Báb in Iran. In 1863, on the eve of departing for Constantinople (now Istanbul) at the invitation of Ottoman authorities, Baháʼu'lláh declared, to the many Bábís who had followed him to Iraq, that he was the Promised One foretold by the Bab—a revelation which had come to him in visions that mark the beginning of his mission in 1852 while chained in the dungeon of Tehran. Following malicious misrepresentations by the Persian ambassador to the Ottoman court, less than four months after arriving in Constantinople Baháʼu'lláh was banished by Sultan Abdulaziz to Adrianople (now Edirne); then in 1868 he was moved as an Ottoman prisoner to their penal colony in ʻAkká (now Acre, in modern Israel).

First in Constantinople, then in Adrianople and 'Akka, Baháʼu'lláh publicly proclaimed his mission as a messenger of God in missives directed to major religious and secular rulers of the time, including Czar Alexander II, Napoleon III, Pope Pius IX, and Queen Victoria. Throughout the remainder of Baháʼu'lláh's life most Bábís became his followers, and adherents became known as Baháʼís. Over the three decades in which Baháʼu'lláh revealed his teachings it became clear how they fulfilled and augmented the prophetic intent of the Báb in stating his message would become "a world religion centering on the principle of the oneness of humankind." Baháʼu'lláh's large body of writings, in both Persian and Arabic, are equivalent to more than 100 volumes. Currently translated into at least 800 languages, Baháʼu'lláh's writings form the foundation upon which the worldwide Baháʼí community now stands in virtually every country on earth.

Towards the end of his life, the strict harsh confinement ordered for Baháʼu'lláh was gradually relaxed by authorities in 'Akka who came to greatly admire him, and he was allowed to live in a home nearby, while still officially a prisoner of that city. Baháʼu'lláh passed in 1892, and his resting place at Bahjí is globally regarded by Baháʼís as a place of pilgrimage. At the time of Baháʼu'lláh's passing, the Baháʼí Faith had members in 13 countries of Asia and Africa. Under the leadership of his son ʻAbdu’l-Bahá, the faith gained a footing in Europe and America, and was further consolidated in Iran—though it continued all the while to suffer intense persecution there.

ʻAbdu’l-Bahá 
The eldest son of Baháʼu'lláh and his wife Navvab was born in Tehran on 23 May 1844, he was named 'Abbas after his paternal grandfather. Because Baháʼu'lláh commonly referred to him as "the Master", most Baháʼís used that term for him until Baháʼu'lláh's passing. After that, he was best known as ʻAbdu’l-Bahá, which means the "servant of Bahá"—a designation he requested Baháʼís use when referring to him, as a constant reminder of his servitude to Baháʼu'lláh and to his cause. In Baháʼu'lláh's written Will he directed all believers to faithfully turn to ʻAbdu'l-Bahá as Head of the Baháʼí Faith, as the Centre of the Covenant of Baháʼu'lláh, and as the sole authoritative Interpreter of his writings.

ʻAbdu’l-Bahá's early childhood in Iran was greatly influenced by his father being a prominent Bábí, and by his parents' families belonging to the country's aristocracy. He and his younger siblings—a sister, Bahíyyih, and a brother, Mihdí—lived in a carefree environment of privilege and happiness. With his father declining a ministerial position in the royal court, during his boyhood ʻAbdu’l-Bahá was witness to his parents' various charitable endeavors. ʻAbdu’l-Bahá received no formal education except for about a year of preparatory school at the age of seven. As he grew he was educated by his mother and an uncle; but most of his learning came from his father. After meeting ʻAbdu’l-Bahá in 1890, noted British orientalist Edward Granville Browne remarked "conversation with him served only to heighten the respect with which his appearance had from the first inspired me. One more eloquent of speech, more ready of argument, more apt of illustration, more intimately acquainted with the sacred books of the Jews, the Christians, and the Muhammadans, could, I should think, scarcely be found even amongst the eloquent, ready, and subtle race to which he belongs. These qualities, combined with a bearing at once majestic and genial, made me cease to wonder at the influence and esteem which he enjoyed even beyond the circle of his father's followers. About the greatness of this man and his power no one who had seen him could entertain a doubt."

When ʻAbdu'l-Bahá was seven, he contracted tuberculosis; though physicians held little hope for his recovery, he was suddenly cured prior to Baháʼu'lláh's banishment from Iran and thus went into exile with him. The event that most affected ʻAbdu'l-Bahá during his childhood in Iran was the 1852 imprisonment of his father for being a prominent Bábí. On one occasion ʻAbdu'l-Bahá accompanied his mother to visit Baháʼu'lláh during his incarceration in the infamous Síyáh-Chál. He described how "I saw a dark, steep place. We entered a small, narrow doorway, and went down two steps, but beyond those one could see nothing. In the middle of the stairway, all of a sudden we heard His [Baháʼu'lláh's] … voice: 'Do not bring him in here', and so they took me back. We sat outside, waiting for the prisoners" to be brought out. From the age of eight ʻAbdu’l-Bahá shared in his father's exile and imprisonment, and even after Baháʼu'lláh's passing ʻAbdu’l-Bahá remained a prisoner of the Ottomans until he was 64, when the Young Turk Revolution of 1908 resulted in the sudden release of all religious and political prisoners held under the old regime. Between 1910–1913 ʻAbdu’l-Bahá made several journeys to the West to spread the Baháʼí message beyond its middle-eastern roots. Throughout his life ʻAbdu’l-Bahá maintained a voluminous correspondence to encourage and guide Baháʼí individuals and communities in Iran and around the world. There are over 27,000 extant documents by ʻAbdu'l-Bahá; among the more well-known are The Secret of Divine Civilization, Some Answered Questions, Tablets of the Divine Plan, and the Tablet to Auguste-Henri Forel. Notes taken of his many talks before groups large and small while he traveled in Europe and North America have also been published.

ʻAbdu’l-Bahá passed away on 28 November 1921 in Haifa (then part of Mandatory Palestine; now Israel's third-largest city). ʻAbdu’l-Bahá's funeral the next day was unlike any ever seen in Palestine: "The High Commissioner of Palestine, Sir Herbert Samuel, the Governor of Jerusalem, the Governor of Phoenicia, the Chief Officials of the Government, the Consuls of the various countries resident in Haifa, the heads of the various religious communities, the notables of Palestine, Jews, Christians, Moslems, Druses, Egyptians, Greeks, Turks, Kurds, and a host of His American, European and native friends, men, women and children,...about ten thousand in number", formed a vast funeral procession of mourners—a spontaneous tribute of love and respect for one who had for over 50 years served, and worked to unite, them all.

Under the Qajar dynasty (1844 – 1925) 
When the Báb declared his prophetic mission in Iran in 1844 the country's sovereign was Muhammad Shah, third monarch of the Qajar dynasty, who ruled from 1834 to 1848. His prime minister Haji Mirza Aqasi actively supported prejudicial requests by Muslim clerics directed against the Báb and Bábís, even becoming an accomplice in their persecutions by convincing the Shah to banish the Báb far from his followers to the remote mountain fortresses of Maku and Chehriq in northwestern Azerbaijan.

Naser al-Din Shah, who succeeded his father in 1848, gave ready assent for the execution of the Báb in 1850; and it was he who decreed Baháʼu'lláh's banishment from Iran in 1852. His first prime minister, Mirza Taqi Khan, was overtly hostile to Bábís and personally ordered the execution of the Báb and several other prominent Bábís; ʻAbdu’l-Bahá referred to him as the greatest oppressor of the Baháʼí Faith in Iran. Under the Qajars an estimated 20,000 Bábís were murdered in Iran for their religious beliefs, while additional tens of thousands suffered innumerable other forms of persecution. Accounts of early persecution and suffering under Qajar rule are found in detail in The Dawn-Breakers, an historical account of the Báb and many of his early followers. This important Baháʼí reference work is based on first-hand accounts reported by early believers.

In later years of Qajar rule, "anti-Bábí pogroms and campaigns usually occurred during provincial or national crises such as those caused by harvest failures, famines, and epidemics. The Bábís (and later Baháʼís) served as scapegoats to cover the state's failure in relation to European economic and political intrusion. Drawing the attention of the public to the evils of this 'devious sect' served to consolidate the relationship between the Qajar government and the clergy." The last Qajar king, Ahmad Shah, was sidelined in a military operation supported by the British and led by military officer Reza Khan, who arranged for his subsequent appointment as Iran's minister of war. Following his departure for Europe in 1923, Ahmad Shah was formally deposed by Iran's parliament in 1925, ending the Qajar dynasty.

Under the Pahlavi dynasty (1925 – 1979)
After Ahmad Shah was deposed at Reza Khan's instigation, the latter was soon proclaimed Iran's new monarch, Reza Shah Pahlavi. The founder of the Pahlavi dynasty, Reza Shah's reign lasted until 1941 when the Allies forced him to abdicate after the Anglo-Soviet invasion of Iran. He was succeeded by his son, Mohammad Reza Pahlavi, the last shah of Iran. Although a few Baháʼís with unique qualifications and integrity were placed in positions of trust by both Pahlavis, and overall incidents of physical assault and murder decreased under them, their respective governments formalized policies of discrimination against Baháʼís as concessions to clergy. 

As a result, though Baháʼís remained Iran's largest religious minority, these shahs denied the basic rights of Baháʼís in numerous ways, including not being allowed to register their marriages; forcing the permanent closure of at least 47 schools) for girls and boys, operated by Baháʼís but open to all irrespective of religious background; banning Baháʼí literature; arbitrarily demoting, firing, or denying pensions for Baháʼís in public service who refused to deny their faith; and not allowing the Baháʼí community freedom to hold religious endowments in its name.

The 1941 forced abdication of Reza Shah, and Mohammad Reza Shah's accession to the throne, was accompanied by a resurgence in influence of Shiite Muslim leaders. The period from 1941-1955 was characterized by growing relationships between the royal court and clerics, and physical danger for Baháʼís—with numerous instances of Baháʼís being expelled from their homes; plundering of Baháʼí property; burning of Baháʼí homes and places of work; and acts of murder as Baháʼís were used as scapegoats for various interactions among clerics, the government, and segments of the population. During this time many Islamic societies, most with anti-Baháʼí agendas, were formed in major cities of Iran. This period culminated in the anti-Baháʼí campaign of 1955 when the Shah allowed "nationwide broadcast of a series of incendiary sermons against the Baháʼís by a leading Shiite preacher in Tehran—apparently hoping to make the Baháʼís a scapegoat to deflect attention from unpopular government policies."

 With national and army radio stations put at his disposal, the preacher fueled a wave of anti-Baháʼí violence across the country; and the Pahlavi regime even assured parliament it had ordered the suppression of all activities of "the Baháʼí sect". Due to this cleric's provocations, the government confiscated Baháʼí properties in cities around the country. In Tehran, in front of foreign and domestic reporters with cameras, the cleric, accompanied by the Shah's army chief, proceeded to personally participate in demolishing the distinctive dome of Iran's national Baháʼí headquarters with pickaxes. As news spread abroad of how anti-Baháʼí propaganda was resulting in growing numbers of murders, rapes and robberies against members of the Baháʼí Faith, a chorus of international condemnation was raised against Iran for allowing such abuse of Baháʼís' human rights. This led the Shah, who was very conscious of such foreign criticism, to finally break with the clerics and rein in what was happening.

Absence of major violence, however, did not result in granting civil rights to Baháʼís. Members of the faith remained ineligible for employment in any government position, though implementation of this ban mostly depended on managers' attitudes in various places and times. Iran's Civil Employment Act of 1966 explicitly mentioned applicants for government jobs should have no prior convictions for "espousing corrupt beliefs", a calculated derogatory reference to Baháʼís. Belief in one of Iran's four official religions (Islam, Judaism, Christianity or Zoroastrianism) was invariably listed as an eligibility requirement in ads for governmental jobs—which meant Baha'is should not bother to apply. Though again depending on those in charge, some would accept for Baháʼís to leave the space for "religion" on employment forms blank. Throughout Mohammad Reza Shah's reign, Baháʼís were studiously ignored as a social group, though in very rare instances when they were "alluded to in mass media, they were called...the misguided sect", and even the most successful and prominent of Baháʼís could never be publicly identified as a member of the faith.

In the final two years of the Shah's reign, as his political problems increased, past patterns of persecution reappeared with the killing of individual Baháʼís, and polemics against Baháʼís as the "cause" of Iran's problems and the need for their "punishment" being raised in media. The latter resulted in sporadic mob attacks, raids, arson, and plundering against Baháʼís in various parts of the country. The short Pahlavi dynasty, and thousands of years of monarchy in Iran, ended when the Iranian Revolution resulted in the complete collapse of Mohammad Reza Pahlavi's rule on 11 February 1979. Following a national referendum, Iran became an Islamic republic on 1 April 1979.

After the Islamic Revolution 
The persecution of Baháʼís in Iran intensified greatly following the 1979 Islamic revolution. The regime that took power essentially does not allow members of the Baháʼí Faith, "even in theory, to exercise freely their religion and to exist and function as an organized religious community." When the new Islamic republic's constitution was drawn up in April 1979, certain rights for Christian, Jewish and Zoroastrian minorities in Iran were specifically mentioned and protected. Ominously, no mention whatsoever was made of the Baháʼí community, Iran's largest religious minority. Under Iran's brand of Islamic ideology, this lack of constitutional protection, in conjunction with unmitigated religious prejudice, has meant Baháʼís effectively have no rights of any sort, and can be attacked and persecuted in Iran without consequences for perpetrators. Government agencies and courts routinely deny Baháʼís the right of redress or protection against assault, killings or other forms of persecution—going so far as to rule that citizens who kill or injure Baháʼís are not even liable for damages because their victims are "unprotected infidels." The "International Religious Freedom Report" of 26 October 2009 by the U.S. Department of State's Bureau of Democracy, Human Rights, and Labor documents that "According to law, Baháʼí blood is considered mobah, meaning it can be spilled with impunity."

As a consequence, Iran's Islamic regime fundamentally denies Baháʼís virtually all citizenship and human rights in the land of their birth. By recognizing other religious minorities in its constitution, but not Baháʼís who are the country's largest religious group after Islam, the regime claims Baháʼís are not a religious group and therefore no reason exists to protect them. Stating Baháʼís are not members of a religion allows the government to then describe them in any way they wish—and to thus create any excuse for arresting, torturing, and executing Baháʼís and their leaders; banning Baháʼí administrative structures; erasing traces of their history and culture by destroying or confiscating Baháʼí sacred sites, religious monuments, and cemeteries; dispossessing Baháʼí individuals, communities, and institutions of their property; forbidding Baháʼís the right to peacefully and freely assemble, even in small groups, for worship, the spiritual training of their children and youth, study of their faith, or to otherwise live their social and cultural beliefs; undermining their intellectual advancement by denying educational rights of Baháʼí children and youth; and seeking to impoverish Baháʼís economically by dismissing them from employment, canceling earned pension payments, and targeting those who open small shops and businesses for harassment, irrational fines, and closure to disrupt their ability to earn a livelihood to sustain their families.

Although instances and levels of repression against Baháʼís have fluctuated—likely due to domestic political shifts and external pressures—since an initial deadly outburst in the first decade after Iran's Islamic revolution, "the clerical establishment's ideological hostility towards" the Baháʼí Faith remains constant. The current Supreme Leader of Iran, Ayatollah Seyyed Ali Khamenei, has been closely associated with anti-Baháʼí campaigns. The 1991 "Baháʼí Question" memorandum signed by him provides clear insight into Khamenei's thinking regarding Baháʼís, stating his intention "to exclude Baháʼís from mainstream Iranian life, block the development of their faith, and perhaps most sinister of all, to even 'destroy' their cultural roots outside the country."

Executions and imprisonment of leaders
In a concerted effort to destroy the Baháʼí community of Iran, almost immediately after coming to power, the Islamic regime began to kidnap and kill Baháʼís, especially those serving at national and local levels of the community. Because the Baháʼí Faith has no clergy, members organize themselves in an administrative system of "annually elected governing councils that operate at the national, regional, and local levels as well as individuals and groups who are formally appointed to assist with various aspects of the community's work and needs." It was these leaders voluntarily serving the Baháʼí community that Iran's government targeted.

Arrest and disappearance of the first national Baháʼí council

Individual members of Iran's national Baháʼí administrative council (known as that community's National Spiritual Assembly) were harassed throughout 1980. On 21 August 1980 while meeting in a private home all nine council members then serving, along with two members of an appointed Baháʼí institution (known as an Auxiliary Board) whom they were consulting with, were summarily arrested by Revolutionary Guardsmen. Families of those arrested tirelessly sought information on their loved ones, meeting with various top government officials until the end of January 1981. One official initially confirmed an arrest order had been issued for the eleven Baháʼís, but said access to them was denied while they were being interrogated. A month later that official contradicted himself by saying none of them had been arrested by the government. The fate of the nine National Spiritual Assembly and two Auxiliary Board members remains unknown, and their disappearance unexplained. It is presumed all were executed by the government, because that is what the Islamic regime did to their elected successors.

Arrest and execution of the second national Baháʼí council
Soon after their national council members were abducted, Iranian Baháʼís gathered to elect a new National Spiritual Assembly. Because of what happened to their predecessors, members of this second national Baháʼí council were fully aware of the risks they faced from the government. Iranian authorities promptly targeted the new Baháʼí leadership: On 13 December 1981, Revolutionary Guards arrested eight of the nine new national council members meeting in the private home of a Baháʼí. Without trial, all eight were executed on 27 December 1981. The head of Iran's judiciary, after an initial denial, finally stated these eight Baháʼís had been executed for "espionage for the benefit of foreign powers." A month later the head of the Central Revolutionary Courts sought to justify the execution of these innocents by saying being a Baháʼí "was synonymous with spying for a foreign power".

Banning, arrest, and execution of the third national Baháʼí council
Mentioning vague oft-repeated but demonstrably false accusations that Baháʼís were agitators, saboteurs against the government, blasphemers, leading Muslims astray, and spies (supposedly for Israel and/or colonial powers), but not providing a shred of evidence, on 29 August 1983 the Attorney-General of the Revolution announced a legal ban on all administrative and community activities of the Baháʼí community in Iran. Before complying with the ban, this third national Baháʼí council—formed following the execution of its predecessors—released an open letter refuting the government's allegations. Delivered to some 2,000 government officials and prominent Iranians, the letter detailed abuses faced by Baháʼís in the Islamic Republic, and appealed to Iran's people and to the Islamic government to restore their rights as citizens and as human beings. In part the national Baháʼí council's letter called on the Iranian regime: ...to end the persecution, arrest, torture, and imprisonment of Baháʼís "for imaginary crimes and on baseless pretexts, because God knows—and so do the authorities—that the only 'crime' of which these innocent ones are guilty is that of their beliefs… ." Emphasizing the implausibility of the espionage allegations, the letter asked: "What kind of spy is an 85-year-old man from Yazd who has never set foot outside his village? … How could students, housewives, innocent young girls, and old men and women… be spies? How could [village farmers] be spies? What secret intelligence documents have been found in their possession? What espionage equipment has come to hand? What 'spying' activities were engaged in by the primary school children who have been expelled from their schools?" The letter further emphasized that "spying is an element of politics, while non-interference in politics is an established principle of the Baháʼí Faith." Responding to the accusation that Baháʼís had been "hoarding" spare automobile parts, the NSA objected: "[i]f the Prosecutor chooses to label the Baháʼí administration as a network of espionage, let him at least consider it intelligent enough not to plan the overthrow of such a strong regime by hoarding a few spare parts!" The letter also drew attention to the fact that while Muslims were praised for sending money abroad (e.g. to Iraq and Jerusalem) for the upkeep of religious shrines, when a Baháʼí did the same, it was considered "an unforgivable sin and... proof that he has done so in order to strengthen other countries [particularly Israel]."This letter was the final act of this national Baháʼí council's membership before they voluntarily disbanded themselves and an estimated 400 local Baháʼí councils around the country. Despite the dissolution of all Baháʼí administrative institutions in Iran, authorities continued to harass and intimidate former members of this national Baháʼí council, former members of disbanded local Baháʼí councils, and other former Baháʼí leaders around the country; along with everyone who signed the open letter defending the Baháʼí community. "Between late 1983 and early 1984 over 500 Baháʼís—most of whom were former council members or related to former members—were arrested without charge." Seven former members of the third National Baháʼí Spiritual Assembly of Iran were arrested, imprisoned, tortured, and finally executed by the Iranian government between May 1984 and September 1987. The government placed the bodies of these seven national council members in the "infidels" section of an old Tehran cemetery. Some of their families reported they were not able to learn the location of their loved ones' bodies until they paid authorities for the cost of the bullets used to execute them.

The Iran Human Rights Documentation Center, an independent non-profit organization founded in 2004 by human rights scholars and lawyers, concludes "that the Revolutionary Courts and other agencies of the Islamic Republic pursued a deliberate strategy designed both to deprive the Baháʼí community of leadership and to criminalize an entire faith. The widespread and systematic nature of the persecution of the Iranian Baháʼís strongly suggests coordinated action and the public statements of senior members of the Iranian regime serve only to further reinforce this impression."

Torture and execution of prominent Baháʼís and members of local Baháʼí councils
Besides targeting Iran's national level Baháʼí leadership, the Islamic regime also pursued Baháʼís known for services to their religion, and members of local Baháʼí councils all over Iran. The first local Baháʼí council member to be executed, who served in Tehran, was hanged on 12 April 1979—just days after the official declaration of the Islamic Republic.

Seeking to actively disenfranchise Baháʼís and to destroy the spirit of their communities, the Islamic regime arrested, imprisoned, tortured and/or executed prominent Baháʼís and those serving in leadership positions around the country. In Tehran, in Karaj, in Yazd, in Tabriz, in Hamadan, in Shiraz, and in scores of smaller cities, towns, and villages, year after year the lives of Baháʼís in every part of Iran have been severely impacted by the Islamic regime's non-stop efforts over four decades to eradicate the Baháʼí Faith in the land of its origin.

Since the 1979 establishment of the Islamic regime in Iran well over 200 Baháʼís have been murdered, or have disappeared at the hands of authorities. In addition to those killed, hundreds more have been tortured or imprisoned. Vehement condemnation by numerous foreign governments, prominent individuals and groups worldwide in response to Iran's brutal killing of Baháʼís—particularly the government's 1983 execution of ten women in Shiraz for teaching Baháʼí children's classes, and its repeated group executions of members of Baháʼí administrative bodies—appeared to result in a slow shift in the regime's strategy for eliminating Iran's Baháʼís. Yet even as numbers of Baháʼís brazenly killed appeared to lessen, the regime increased its efforts to stifle and strangle the cultural and social life of Iranian Baháʼís.

Routine dealings with the "Yaran" and then their abrupt imprisonment

When the Baháʼí administration was banned by Iran's government in 1983, several Baháʼís formed a group to informally serve the needs of the country's estimated 300,000 Baháʼís on an ad hoc basis. "This arrangement was made with the full knowledge of the Iranian government, which had routine dealings with them from 1983" until early 2008 when the seven then serving in this way were suddenly arrested by the government. This happened in spite of the fact that, as a signatory to Article 18 of the International Convention on Civil and Political Rights, Iran is legally bound to uphold every person's human right "to have or to adopt a religion or belief of [one's] choice," and "to manifest [one's] religion or belief in worship, observance, practice and teaching." Yet by declaring as illegal even this informal arrangement for seeing to the needs of Iran's largest non-Muslim religious minority, the government clearly sought to "debar Baháʼís from practicing any of the communal events associated with the worship and practice of [their] religion, including marriages, funerals, and other basic elements among the adherents of any religion."
Known collectively among Baháʼís as the "Yaran" (meaning "the Friends"), the seven in this ad hoc fellowship coordinated Baha'i community activities relating to "the education of children and youth, opportunities to study and learn about family life, the advancement of women, upholding high personal moral standards, freeing themselves and their communities from prejudice" and "the inculcation of a spirit of service to humanity." The seven Yaran arrested were held for nine months before any charges were made, "and even then it was at a press conference, not in a court setting." The spurious accusations against them were "forming or managing a group that aims at disturbing national security"; "spreading propaganda against the regime of the Islamic Republic of Iran"; "engaging in espionage"; "gathering classified information with the intention of disturbing national security or of making it available to others"; "collaborating with foreign governments hostile to Iran, by some of the accused having taken trips to a number of European countries, such as Turkey and Germany, and by meetings of some of the accused with Australian and Canadian ambassadors"; and for "having assembled for the purpose of conspiring to commit offences against national security by having attended conferences held at the Defenders of Human Rights Center."

In Iran detainees who have been charged have the supposed right to seek bail and to be released pending trial—yet despite numerous requests these Baháʼí leaders were consistently denied bail. The seven were also denied access to "lawyers for more than a year and then only allowed barely one hour of contact before their trial began." Finally their trial started on 12 January 2010, followed by two other court sessions in February and April 2010. Then on 7 August 2010, without presenting any evidence to prove the final charges, and despite the fact the Yaran had been serving their fellow believers' spiritual and social needs with the full knowledge and permission of the government for about 25 years, the Revolutionary Court in Tehran convicted all seven of "espionage for Israel", "insulting religious sanctities" and "propaganda against the system" and sentenced each of the seven to 20 years imprisonment. Amnesty International promptly called for their immediate release, describing the verdict as "a sad and damning manifestation of the deeply-rooted discrimination against Baháʼís by the Iranian authorities." In September 2010, an appeals court acquitted the Yaran of some charges, including espionage, and consequently reduced their sentences to 10 years. In March 2011, however, Iranian authorities reinstated the 20-year sentences.

In 2013 Iran adopted a new penal code. When terms of the new code were finally applied after much delay to the Yaran in November 2015, their sentences were again reduced from 20 to 10 years. Though the seven were also clearly eligible for immediate release at that time, considering other provisions of the new code regarding conditional release for those who had served at least half their sentences, it was never applied to the Baháʼís. On 18 September 2017 Mahvash Sabet, the first of the Yaran group to be arrested on 5 March 2008, was the first to be released after 10 years of unjust imprisonment. The six remaining former Yaran, who had each been arrested on 14 May 2008, were then slowly released over a period of more than a year; on 20 December 2018 Afif Naeimi was the last of the former Yaran group freed. Though these Baháʼís were finally out of prison, the daily pervasive grind of persecution against each of them and all their co-religionists in Iran continues unabated. The imprisonment of this group, particularly the story of Fariba Kamalabadi was the subject of Afghan-American filmmaker Misaq Kazimi's documentary.

Repression, denial of human rights, and efforts to eliminate 
Numerous reports and statements of the United Nations and its various human rights bodies, of concerned national governments and their agencies, of many diverse non-governmental organizations and human rights groups, and of the Baháʼí International Community itself document in detail numerous instances and ways in which Iran's Islamic regime has persecuted and continues to torment members of the Baháʼí Faith in Iran. Specific instances are myriad and cannot be reviewed in an overview article; nevertheless several especially egregious areas of Iran's ongoing systematic persecution against members of the Baháʼí Faith in the country are mentioned below.

Cultural and social repression
In February 1979 the assets of two longstanding Baháʼí-owned companies were simultaneously seized: Nawnahálán, which began as a savings bank for Baháʼí children in 1917 and then grew with them to hold funds for an estimated 15,000 adults as well as local and national Baháʼí institutions; and Umaná, a legal holding company for some 1,000 Baháʼí communal properties and buildings including holy places associated with founders of the Baháʼí Faith; many Baháʼí cemeteries; a large hospital in Tehran caring for people of all religions and treating the poor at no cost; and facilities for Baháʼí meetings and worship. All assets and related legal documents for accounts and property deeds were confiscated, without any financial consideration for legal owners, and placed under government control. With Umaná's records in its possession the government was able to quickly and easily identify all sites of importance to Baháʼís in Iran.

In March and April 1979 the government began confiscating or destroying Baháʼí religious properties or monuments around Iran, the most important of which was the House of the Báb in Shiraz—the spot where the Báb first proclaimed his mission in 1844, and a revered place of pilgrimage for Baháʼís around the world. On 26 April 1979 the Baháʼís community of Shiraz was told by Revolutionary Guards that the property was being placed under supervision "in order to protect and prevent possible damage" to it. The regime's real intentions became clear on 1 September 1979 when demolition began on buildings surrounding the property; a week later authorities began destroying the House of the Báb itself. In 1981 the site was turned into a road and public square; and later a mosque was built on it. Since demolishing the House of the Báb, Iranian authorities have destroyed almost all Baháʼí holy places in Iran, including a house in Tehran where Baháʼu'lláh was born, and other important sites associated with Bábí-Baháʼí history. Destruction of these sites have sometimes been followed by construction of mosques in their place as deliberate acts of triumphalism.

Another means of stripping Baháʼís of their cultural identity, and erasing ties to their heritage as a whole, has involved Baháʼí cemeteries around the country being methodically befouled, desecrated or destroyed through vandalism and destruction of facilities, with tombstones smashed, and corpses exhumed or left exposed. Prior to its destruction and the bulldozing of more than 15,000 graves, Tehran's Baháʼí cemetery was noted for being one of the most beautiful places in the capital. When Queen Elizabeth II visited Iran during the time of the late Shah, her itinerary included "a guided tour to this place to show her its beauty and to a Baháʼí [operated] hospital to demonstrate the type of [world class] medical service rendered to Iranians." The Islamic government does not allow Baháʼís to be buried in Muslim cemeteries because they are considered 'unclean' infidels. When they are allowed to secure a spot to bury their dead, cemetery officials often disallow Baháʼís their rights for burial according to Baháʼí religious laws. When authorities bury Baháʼís themselves, their families are usually only informed where their loved ones are after burials have taken place. Since August 2005, at least 83 attacks have taken place against Baháʼí cemeteries across Iran—destroying graves and causing extensive damage. No individuals or groups responsible have ever been punished.

Official Iranian policy against its Baháʼí citizens was disclosed by the UN Special Representative on the Human Rights Situation in the Islamic Republic of Iran in 1993 when it obtained a secret 1991 government memorandum. Produced by Iran's Supreme Revolutionary Cultural Council and personally approved by the Supreme Leader, Ali Khamenei, this document—stamped "confidential"—is direct evidence that what was happening to Baháʼís in Iran was being directed at the highest levels of the government. Entitled "The Baháʼí Question", it details precise strategies and instructions, and states the "government's dealings with [Baháʼís] must be in such a way that their progress and development are blocked". It seeks to "Deny them any position of influence, such as in the educational sector, etc."; and indicates the regime aims to keep Baháʼís "illiterate and uneducated, living only at a subsistence level" through a series of repressive measures restricting the educational, economic, and cultural life of Iranian Baháʼís. The plan it stipulates was "quietly implemented, even as the government of President Mohammad Khatami projected an image of moderation around the world."

This memorandum remains in effect today. Through random home raids, unlawful arrests, arbitrary detentions, and violations of due process by agencies of the Iranian government, members of the Baháʼí Faith are constantly victims of efforts to repress and intimidate them. Nowhere in Iran are Baháʼís ever free to practice their religion without harassment. Simple prayer gatherings, religious meetings, or efforts to serve others are forbidden. Since the 2013 election of Hassan Rouhani to Iran's presidency, at least 498 arrests of Baháʼís and 95 summons to prison have been documented. In the year leading up to August 2020 alone there have been at least 66 arrests. Since the start of the COVID-19 pandemic, courts have been increasingly handing down lengthy sentences for spurious charges made against Baháʼís, putting their lives at serious risk in the country's overcrowded prison system.

Denial of the right to education 
The denial of the right to higher education is a tool wielded by the Iranian government on many whose ideology contradicts or threatens the authority of the ruling clerics; however, the Baháʼís are the only group to face pervasive group denial of this right. The efforts of the Iranian government to deny Baháʼís the right to education is seen as part of its coordinated efforts to eradicate the Baháʼí community as a viable component of Iranian society.

Shortly after the Iranian revolution in 1979, large numbers of Baháʼí students, ranging across the entire educational system from primary through secondary and university level, were expelled from schools and blocked from continuing their education. Similarly, Baháʼí professors and faculty members were dismissed from all universities and academic institutions in the country. In the 1980s, partly in response to international pressure, primary and secondary school children were allowed to re-enroll. However, up to the present the government has maintained the ban on the entry of Baháʼí youth into public and private colleges and universities. The official decree barring Baháʼí students from admission to public universities was issued in 1981. That year universities established a new admissions system in which only individuals who identified themselves with one of the four religions recognized by the constitution of the Islamic regime were admitted. The systemic nature of the government's prejudicial policy was made very clear in a top-level 1991 private memorandum prepared by the Iranian Revolutionary Council and approved by Ayatollah Khamenei which states "The Government's dealings with [the Baháʼís] must be in such a way that their progress and development are blocked. ... They can be enrolled in schools provided they have not identified themselves as Baháʼís. ... Preferably they should be enrolled in schools which have a strong and imposing religious ideology. ... They must be expelled from universities, either in the admission process or during the course of their studies, once it becomes known that they are Baháʼís."

For the Iranian government to say, as they have, that if Baháʼís identify themselves as Muslims on their entrance exams they would be allowed to enroll is disingenuous, as it is well-known that as a matter of religious principle Baháʼís refuse to dissimulate their beliefs. Confirming these findings, an investigation by the international organization Committee of Concerned Scientists found that university officials in Iran had "received orders from above not to score the tests of Baháʼí students," or that these officials had suggested that a student would receive his test scores only if the student's family renounced their faith. The Committee called for "the complete publication of all test scores without discrimination."

In response to the government's campaign to totally deny their youth access to higher education, the Baháʼí community of Iran established the Baháʼí Institute for Higher Education (BIHE) in 1987; it has been described both as "an elaborate act of communal self-preservation", and as "the fundamental definition of constructive resilience." Despite numerous arrests, periodic raids, several imprisonments of those involved, mass confiscation of school equipment and general harassment, BIHE has continued and even expanded its operations. BIHE has received much praise for offering a non-violent, creative, and constructive response to ongoing oppression. As a unique, highly decentralized, open university BIHE utilizes an all-volunteer unpaid faculty, many of whom were fired as professors from Iranian universities when Baháʼís were steadily purged from positions in government-operated institutions. In Iran BIHE currently "has five faculties with 5 associate programs, 18 undergraduate degree programs and 14 graduate programs", offering more than 1050 courses in the arts and sciences. With almost a thousand faculty and administrative staff, BIHE now accepts about 450 students into its first year programs. All applicants "conform to the same rigorous academic standards as other students in Iran", and "must pass the national entrance exam, and meet all the BIHE academic requirements". BIHE's high standards have earned it an internationally recognized reputation for academic quality, attested to by the fact its graduates "have been accepted at more than 100 different university graduate programs outside of Iran", many recognized as being among the world's finest.

Since its inception, BIHE's online component has attracted growing numbers of volunteer professors outside of Iran; known as its "Affiliated Global Faculty" (AGF), these volunteers work with colleagues inside Iran to "assist with the development, implementation and instruction of the BIHE courses". AGF professors holding PhD-level degrees reside in Africa, Asia, Australia, Europe, Latin America, and North America; this diversity of teaching staff is "one of the unique and impressive features" of BIHE. In addition to teaching, AGF assist BIHE as researchers and consultants. After four decades, the government of Iran continues to harass, arrest, and imprison Baháʼís associated with endeavors of the Baháʼí Faith to educate its youth in Iran. Though Iran's constitution describes access to education as a fundamental right of its citizens, and the Universal Declaration of Human Rights and the UN's International Covenant on Economic, Social and Cultural Rights have both been ratified by Iran's government, the country continues to overtly and covertly deny Baháʼís their educational rights.

Economic persecution 
Since its establishment the Islamic regime has systematically sought to deny Baháʼís the right to work and employment, in direct contravention of Article 23.1 of the Universal Declaration of Human Rights and Part III and Article 6 of the International Covenant on Economic, Social and Cultural Rights. Soon after the Islamic revolution, the central government issued circulars throughout Iran stating Baháʼís were to be removed from all civil service positions unless they became Muslims. On 30 June 1980 an edict was published declaring payments from the National Treasury to Baháʼís had been declared haram (prohibited as a matter of religious faith), thereafter retired Baháʼís who had been receiving pension payments lost them. The disenfranchisement of Baháʼís in public employment continued unabated; by 1987 "over 11,000 Baháʼí government employees had lost their jobs as a result of the anti-Baháʼí legislation."

In 1980 Iranian Revolutionary Courts began empowering local authorities to confiscate property privately-held by individual Baháʼís. In some cases individuals whose property had been seized were allowed to use it until they died, but upon death only a Muslim family member could inherit it. "If no Muslim relative could be found, the property automatically transferred to the ownership of Imam Khomeini's Charitable Organization." Since 2006, various trade associations, unions, and business groups have been asked to compile lists of Baháʼís in every type of employment under their purview. In many cities authorities systematically seal Baháʼí-owned shops on the flimsiest of excuses. Official documents again prove such abuse is not isolated or arbitrary, but rather a matter of established government policy. A 9 April 2007 letter from Tehran's Public Places Supervision Office confirms orders to police commanders and heads of intelligence and security throughout the province saying "members of the 'perverse Bahaist sect' must be prevented from engaging in certain occupations. The letter stipulates that Baháʼís must be denied work permits and licenses for over 25 kinds of specifically-listed businesses and are barred from any other 'high-earning businesses'."

In hundreds of cases, authorities have taken measures making it extremely difficult for Baháʼís to earn a simple living. "Incidents include arbitrary shop closures, unjust dismissals, the actual or threatened revocation of business licenses, and other actions to suppress the economic activity of Baháʼís." One UN Special Rapporteur investigating human rights issues in Iran reported in 2016 that he "continues to receive troubling reports that the authorities continue to pursue activities that deprive Baháʼís of their right to work, reportedly in line with a directive issued by the Supreme Council of the Cultural Revolution in 1991. These policies restrict the types of businesses and jobs Baháʼí citizens can have, support the closing of Baháʼí-owned businesses, place pressure on business owners to dismiss Baháʼí employees and call for seizure of their businesses and property."

Since President Rouhani came to power in 2013, at least 1080 incidents of economic persecution or discrimination have been documented, 31 incidents happened in the year leading up to August 2020. One instance is the 4 November 2019 decision of the Special Court for Article 49 of the Constitution to "confiscate all of the properties belonging to Baháʼís in the Village of Ivel"—properties that have been in the possession of Baháʼís since the mid-1800s.

Incitement to hatred 
For decades, efforts by the Islamic regime to incite hatred, distrust, intolerance, and violence against Baháʼís have steadily increased. Some officials and clergy openly encourage persecution of Baháʼís. As part of an institutionalized incitement to hatred, "National and provincial budgets have included allocations for 'educational' programs to 'confront' the Baháʼí Faith, and official organs have been established and dedicated to that purpose." Material from these efforts "present a wide range of completely false allegations. Incitement to hatred against the Baháʼís has long been a mainstay of campaigns by the government to promote religious orthodoxy." As a result, Baháʼís in communities across Iran "receive threatening telephone calls, text messages, and anonymous letters, and they encounter anti-Baháʼí pamphlets in shops, schools, and other public places. In many localities, graffiti is spray-painted in and on Baháʼí cemeteries, houses, shops, orchards, and vehicles. Without fail, these secondary sources of slander contain the very same malicious lies and incendiary language found in media affiliated with and controlled and sanctioned by the government".

In the year leading up to August 2020, more than 9,511 articles, videos, or web pages "appearing in government-controlled or government-sponsored media" have featured anti-Baháʼí propaganda. In all cases, the dissemination was sponsored and/or approved by the State. "Since August 2016, hundreds of influential figures, including clerics, religious figures, academics, editors, and government representatives have publicly issued speeches, articles, or written declarations against the Baháʼís" which have been published on "websites of various media organizations affiliated with the Iranian government". Because the government denies Baháʼís access to ways to communicate with the public in Iran, they are unable to counter the lies and misinformation being propagated against them and their faith. On 26 March 2018, Iran's Supreme Leader Ali Khamenei issued on his website a new religious decree (fatwa) regarding "association and dealing with Baháʼís", stating "[y]ou should avoid any association and dealings with this perverse and misguided sect."

Responses to the persecution of Iran's Baháʼís

International support for Iran's Baháʼís 
Not long after the Islamic regime's 1979 destruction of the House of the Báb, followed by its August 1980 abduction and murder of all nine members of the national Baháʼí council then serving in post-revolutionary Iran, many foreign government bodies, human rights groups, and prominent individuals worldwide began condemning Iran's persecution of Baháʼís and their faith in that country. On 10 September 1980 the Sub-Commission on the Prevention of Discrimination and Protection of Minorities expressed “profound concern” over the persecution of Baháʼís in Iran, the first such resolution ever by a body of the United Nations.

Condemnation of all aspects of Iran's pervasive and unrelenting persecution of its Baháʼí community has been widespread, global, and continuous since 1979. The United Nations General Assembly and various UN bodies, the European Parliament, both houses of the US Congress, heads of state, and parliamentarians and representatives serving numerous other nations have made clear their condmenation of the government of Iran's actions towards its Baháʼí citizens. Over the years increasing numbers of Iranians both within and outside Iran have added their voices to denounce the persecution. In November 2018 a group of Iranian Muslim intellectuals condemned the “systematic and deeply rooted violation of Baháʼí citizens’ rights” and described it as “being inhumane and contrary to religious and moral obligations.”

According to the Baháʼí International Community, "At every turn during the...[last] four decades of systematic persecution against Baháʼís in Iran, the international response and outcry has been critical in preventing an escalation of violence."

Baháʼí response 
In spite of the fact Baháʼís are Iran's only non-Muslim minority to accept Muhammad's divine station and to recognize the Quran's authenticity, they have been consistently denied the basic civil rights granted to other religious minority groups in the country. Since 1844 Baháʼí individuals and communities in Iran have been targeted by "recurrent waves of hostile propaganda and censorship, social ostracism and exclusion, denial of education, denial of employment, denial of due process before the law, property looting and destruction, government seizure of individual and collective assets, arson, incitements to mob violence, arbitrary arrests and imprisonments, physical and psychological torture, death threats, executions, and disappearances—all calculated to extinguish the community."

Beginning with the severe violence that characterized the religion's earliest years in the mid-nineteenth century, generations of Iran's Baháʼís have lived and suffered, under kings and clerics, "as an oppressed and vulnerable minority, experiencing recurrent episodes of violent persecution. These episodes have been driven by incitements from the pulpit as well as media propaganda reflecting a calculated effort to poison public sentiment toward the Baháʼís and to intimidate fair-minded and sympathetic Iranians who might be moved to come to their defense." Despite severe persecution over almost eighteen decades, the Baháʼís of Iran "have refused to adopt the culture of victimhood or to respond to their oppressors with hatred," instead they have invariably faced opposition with fortitude and "constructive resilience." In his writings Baháʼu'lláh encouraged and lauded such a response among early believers, thus inspiring those of later generations: "Praise be to God that ye did not commit oppression whilst ye were oppressed, that ye wished not to injure anyone though ye were afflicted with grievous injury, that with the utmost compassion ye beseeched God's mercy for all people though ye witnessed the onslaught of cruelty, that ye yearned for freedom though ye were imprisoned." [He then counseled them:] "... never to forfeit this most exalted station, never to overstep the bounds of humaneness, and to leave the character and manners of the beasts and brutes to their like. ... Through your pure deeds and saintly character the lights of justice, which are veiled and hidden by the oppression of the tyrants, will most assuredly shine resplendent...". 

Rather than "yielding to oppression, Baháʼís have bravely approached the very same officials who seek to persecute them," citing Islamic teachings when dealing with religious persecution and using "legal reasoning based on Iranian law and the country's constitution" when seeking their legitimate rights from government authorities. In Baháʼu'lláh's writings "empowerment”, when in opposition to "oppression", implies "empowerment is itself the method for eradicating oppression. This empowerment flows from the realization and actualization of the inner power of the spirit; it cannot be attained by the sword or any form of coercion but only through spiritual awakening and consciousness." For Baháʼís, then, persecution is dealt with not by "anger or hatred against the oppressors but by universal love for all people and belief in the dignity and sacredness of the entire human race. From this perspective, one opposes injustice not to degrade the oppressor but rather to help restore the human dignity and rights of the oppressed as well as to help the oppressor overcome self-alienation, self-dehumanization, and self-oppression. Such an approach requires rejecting not only physical violence but also violence of language and sentiments."

A growing number of nations, human rights organizations, and people around the world have in recent years condemned the Iranian government for its continued systematic persecution of Baháʼís. In Iran itself, increasing numbers of individuals, "including intellectuals, journalists, activists, filmmakers, artists and a number of clerics", have voiced support for the rights of Baháʼís, recognizing that the situation of Baháʼís in that country "represents a litmus test of the condition of that society and its ability to safeguard the rights of every citizen." Likewise, "more and more, ordinary citizens are giving support to their Baháʼí friends and neighbors by patronizing their businesses or protesting their expulsion from schools."

Regardless of daily hardships and pressures faced in Iran, and efforts by the Iranian government that even encourage them to flee their homeland, many Baháʼís choose to stay—firmly believing it is their "responsibility to contribute to the progress and advancement of their homeland", even if in small ways in collaboration with their fellow citizens.

See also
Religion in Iran
Freedom of religion in Iran
Iranian Taboo

Notes

Citations

References

Further reading

External links
 "Iranian Revolutionary Justice" ~ English language version of a BBC World Service October 2015 documentary 
 Archives of Baháʼí Persecution in Iran ~ A documentary database depicting the depth and breadth of Iran's persecution of Baháʼís
 The Baháʼís of Iran ~ a Persian language website of the Baháʼí Faith 
 Selected Messages to the Baháʼís of Iran ~ from the World Council of the Baháʼí Faith (Persian & English)